Mumbai, India has centuries of history and many sites of tourist interest. Some of them are:

Amusements, parks, studio and zoos 

 Adlabs Imagica
 Andheri Sports Complex 
 B.P.T. Ground
 Bandra Kurla Complex Ground
 Brabourne Stadium
 Colaba Woods 
 Cooperage Ground
 Cross Maidan
 Dadaji Kondadev Stadium
 DY Patil Stadium
 EsselWorld
 Gilbert Hill
 Gowalia Tank
 Hanging Gardens of Mumbai
 Horniman Circle Gardens
 Jijamata Udyaan
 Jogger's Park
 Joseph Baptista Gardens
 Kamala Nehru Park 
 Mahalaxmi Racecourse 
 Mahindra Hockey Stadium
 Middle Income Group Club Ground
 Sanjay Gandhi National Park
 Sardar Vallabhbhai Patel Indoor Stadium
 Shivaji Park
 Wankhede Stadium

Beaches, dams and lakes 

 Aksa Beach 
 Bandra Talao
 Girgaum Chowpatty
Juhu Beach
 Kalamb Beach
 Marvé Beach 
 Modak Sagar 
 Powai Lake
 Tulshi Dam 
 Tulsi Lake
 Vihar Dam
 Vihar Lake

Caves 

 Elephanta Caves
 Jogeshwari Caves
 Kanheri Caves
 Mahakali Caves
 Mandapeshwar Caves

Cinemas and film studios 

 Annapurna Studios
 Bombay Talkies
  Capitol Cinema
 Coronation Cinema
 Dadasaheb Phalke Chitranagari
 Eros Cinema 
 Filmistan 
 Kamalistan Studios
 Liberty Cinema
 Maratha Mandir 
 Mehboob Studio
 Metro Big Cinemas 
 New Empire Cinema
 Plaza cinema 
 R. K. Studio
 Rajkamal Kalamandir
 Ranjit Studios
 Regal Cinema
 Royal Opera House
 Sterling Cineplex
 Wadia Movietone

Forts 

 Bassein Fort
 Belapur Fort
 Bombay Castle
 Castella de Aguada
 Dongri Fort
 Fort George, Bombay
 Ghodbunder Fort
 Madh Fort
 Mahim Fort
 Mazagon Fort
 Riwa Fort
 Sewri Fort
 Sion Hillock Fort
 Worli Fort

Malls and markets 

 Chor Bazaar
 Colaba Causeway
 Crawford Market
 Crossroads Mall (Mumbai)
 Dava Bazaar
 Dharavi
 Fashion Street 
 Hill Road
 Zaveri Bazaar
 High Street Phoenix
 Phoenix Marketcity (Mumbai)
 Inorbit Mall, Malad
 Inorbit Mall, Vashi
 Infinity Mall, Andheri
 Infiniti Mall, Malad
 Lamington Road 
 Linking Road
 Lohar Chawl
 Mahatma Jyotiba Phule Mandai 
 Metro Junction Mall
 Princess Street
 R City Mall
 R-Mall
 Viviana Mall
 Raghuleela Mega Mall
 Raghuleela Mall, Vashi

Museums 

 Antarang – Sex Health Information Art Gallery
 Chhatrapati Shivaji Maharaj Vastu Sangrahalaya
 Cowasji Jehangir Hall
 Dr. Bhau Daji Lad Museum
 Mani Bhavan
  National Gallery of Modern Art
 Nehru Science Centre

Places of worship 
Mahalakshmi Temple 
Located at mahalakshmi station 
Popularly known as Goddess of money.
.

Churches 

 Afghan Church
 Cathedral of the Holy Name
 Church of Our Lady of Dolours, Wadala
 Church of Our Lady of Health, Cavel
 Church of Our Lady of Mount Carmel, Bandra
 Gloria Church
 Holy Cross Church, Kurla
 Mount Mary Church, Bandra
 Our Lady of Egypt Church
 Church of Our Lady of Good Counsel & Shrine of St. Anthony, Sion
 Our Lady of Immaculate Conception Church, Mt. Poinsur
 Portuguese Church
 Sacred Heart Church, Santacruz
 St. Andrew's Church
 St. John the Baptist Church
 St. Joseph's Church, Juhu
 St. Michael's Church
 St. Thomas Cathedral

Hindu temples 
 Babulnath
 Jivdani Mata
 Jogeshwari Caves
 Kadeshwari Devi Temple
 Lalbaugcha Raja
 Mahalakshmi Temple
 Mumba Devi Temple
 Shaneshwar Sansthan
 Shreebalajimandir
 Shri Swaminarayan Mandir
 Siddhivinayak Temple
 Wagheshwari Temple
 Walkeshwar Temple
 Iscon Temple

Masjid or Shrines 
 Haji Ali Dargah
 Makhdoom Ali Mahimi
 Jama Masjid
 Raudat Tahera

Synagogues 
 Gate of Mercy Synagogue
 Knesset Eliyahoo
 Magen David Synagogue (Byculla)
 Nariman House

Others 
 Global Vipassana Pagoda
 Gurudwara Khalsa Sabha, Matunga

References

Further reading
Sights in Mumbai (Bombay) - Lonely Planet
Tourist Places in Mumbai (Bombay) - The Weekend Leader
Must Visit Sights and Attractions of South Mumbai
Mumbai tourist attraction

 
Tourist attractions
Mumbai
Mumbai